Kayanna  is a village in Kozhikode district in the state of Kerala, India.

Demographics
 India census, Kayanna had a population of 16,028 with 7,964 males and 8,064 females.
Kayanna is also known as Kayanna Bazar which was derived from Kasyapa Mannu. The old Kasyapa Munin was made thapas in here.
Kayanna grama panchayath is the panchayath having the youngest panchayath president in 2005 around the state Sheeba.

Transportation
Kayannavillage connects to other parts of India through Vatakara town on the west and Kuttiady town on the east.  National Highway No. 66 passes through Vatakara and the northern stretch connects to Mangalore, Goa and Mumbai.  The southern stretch connects to Cochin and Trivandrum.  The eastern National Highway No.54 going through Kuttiady connects to Mananthavady, Mysore and Bangalore. The nearest airports are at Kannur and Kozhikode.  The nearest railway station is at Vatakara.

History
Kayanna police station became notorious for torturing communists like Rajan during the Indian emergency of the 1970s.

References

Kuttiady area